Eulagisca gigantea is a scale worm that is widely distributed around Antarctica and the Southern Ocean at depths of about .

Description
It is dorso-ventrally flattened and has 40 segments with 15 pairs of elytra. The prostomium is oval and the back part is concealed by a nuchal fold. The lateral antennae are inserted terminally on the anterior margin of the prostomium. The notochaetae are about as thick as the neurochaetae, but bidentate neurochaetae absent. The eversible proboscis bears a pair of large jaws and is about a quarter of the length of the whole organism. It is a greyish-brown colour and without patterning.

References

Further reading

 

Phyllodocida
Animals described in 1939